Seon-mi, also spelled Sun-mi, is a Korean feminine given name. Its meaning differs based on the hanja used to write each syllable of the name. There are 41 hanja with the reading "sun" and 33 hanja with the reading "mi" on the South Korean government's official list of hanja which may be registered for use in given names.

People with this name include:
Hwang Sun-mi (born 1963), South Korean writer
Park Sun-mi (born 1972), South Korean taekwondo coach
Song Seon-mi (born 1974), South Korean actress
Pak Sun-mi (born 1982), South Korean volleyball player
Park Seon-mi (born 1982), South Korean field hockey player
Song Sun-mi (born 1990), South Korean squash player
Sunmi (born 1992), South Korean singer, former member of girl group Wonder Girls
Heo Seon-mi (born 1995), South Korean artistic gymnast

See also
 Sonmi (born 1989), Zainichi Korean model
 List of Korean given names

References

Korean feminine given names